The , also known as "the orb and cross", is an orb surmounted by a cross. It has been a Christian symbol of authority since the Middle Ages, used on coins, in iconography, and with a sceptre as royal regalia. 

The cross represents Christ's dominion over the orb of the world, literally held in the hand of an earthly ruler. In the iconography of Western art, when Christ himself holds the globe, he is called Salvator Mundi (Latin for 'Saviour of the World').  For instance, the  16th-century Infant Jesus of Prague statue holds a globus cruciger in this manner.

History

Holding the world in one's hand, or, more ominously, under one's foot, has been a symbol since antiquity. To citizens of the Roman Empire, the plain spherical globe held by the god Jupiter represented the world or the universe, as the dominion held by the Emperor. A 2nd-century coin from the reign of Emperor Hadrian shows the Roman goddess Salus with her foot upon a globus, and a 4th-century coin from the reign of Emperor Constantine I shows him with a globus in hand. The orbis terrarum was central to the iconography of the Tetrarchy, in which it represented the Tetrarchs' restoration of security to the Roman world. Constantine I claimed to have had a vision of symbol of Christ above the sun, with the words "In this sign, you shall conquer" (Latin: "In hoc signo vinces"), before the Battle of Milvian Bridge in AD 312. This symbol is usually assumed to be the "Chi-Rho (X-P)" symbol, but some think it was a cross. Consequently, his soldiers painted this symbol on their shields and then defeated their foe, Maxentius.With the growth of Christianity in the 5th century, the orb (in Latin works orbis terrarum, the 'world of the lands', whence "orb" derives) was surmounted with a cross, hence globus cruciger, symbolizing the Christian God's dominion of the world. The Emperor held the world in his hand to show that he ruled it on behalf of God. To non-Christians already familiar with the pagan globe, the surmounting of a cross indicating the victory of Christianity over the world. In medieval iconography, the size of an object relative to those of nearby objects indicated its relative importance; therefore the orb was small and the one who held it was large to emphasize the nature of their relationship. Although the globe symbolized the whole Earth, many Christian rulers, some of them not even sovereign, who reigned over small territories of the Earth, used it symbolically.

The first known depiction in art of the symbol was probably in the early 5th century AD, possibly as early as AD 395, namely on the reverse side of the coinage of Emperor Arcadius, yet most certainly by AD 423 on the reverse side of the coinage of Emperor Theodosius II.

The globus cruciger was associated with powerful rulers and angels; it adorned portrayals of both emperors and kings, and also archangels. It remained popular throughout the Middle Ages in coinage, iconography, and royal regalia. The papacy, which in the Middle Ages rivaled the Holy Roman Emperor in temporal power, also used the symbol on top of the Papal tiara, which consisted of a triple crown; the Pope did not use a separate orb as a symbol. The globus cruciger (made up of a monde and cross) was generally featured as the finial of European royal crowns, whether on physical crowns or merely in royal heraldry, for example, in Denmark, the Holy Roman Empire, Hungary, Italy, The Netherlands, Portugal, Romania, Spain, Sweden, and Yugoslavia.  It is still depicted not only in the arms of European polities for which a monarchy survives, yet also, since the end of communism in 1991, in the arms of some eastern European polities, despite the termination of their historical monarchies. Even in the modern era in the United Kingdom, the Sovereign's Orb symbolizes both the state and Church of England under the protection and domain of the monarchy.

Gallery

Use as an alchemical symbol
The globus cruciger was used as the alchemical symbol (♁) for antimony. It was also used as an alchemical symbol for Lupus metallorum “the grey wolf” supposedly used to purify alloyed metals into pure gold. Lupus metallorum or stibnite, used to purify gold, as the sulphur in the antimony sulphide bonds to the metals alloyed with the gold, and these form a slag which can be removed. The gold remains dissolved in the metallic antimony which can be boiled off to leave the purified gold.

See also
 The Ball and the Cross
 Holy Hand Grenade of Antioch
 Monde (crown)
 Earth symbol
 Celestial spheres
 T and O map
 Apfelgroschen, coin depicting the orb and cross of the Holy Roman Empire

References

 Leslie Brubaker, Dictionary of the Middle Ages, vol 5, pg. 564, 
 Picture of the 10th century Orb, Scepter and Crown insignia of the Holy Roman Empire

External links 

Christian iconography
Christian symbols
Cross symbols
Formal insignia
Latin religious words and phrases
Regalia
Religious symbols
Heraldic charges
Byzantine regalia
Spherical objects